DAV Public School, Sasaram, India is a co-educational English medium school, affiliated to Central Board of Secondary Education (CBSE) Delhi, educating up to Class XII. The school is managed by the Dayanand Anglo-Vedic College Trust and Management Society, New Delhi.

History 
The school was founded in 1997 in a rented building and now has a campus at Hansraj Nagar, Admapur. The campus has a garden, a computer lab, Physics, Chemistry, Biology and Mathematics labs; an audio-visual room, and a library. The school was started within a single 
but now, it has four huge building.

School identity
The DAV institutions, imbued with the ethics of Swami Dayanand and innovated by Mahatma Hansraj, are intended to mould the students into the Anglo-Vedic culture. Hawan is performed every Saturday. Dharma Shiksha books are prescribed to educate the students in moral values. Vedic initiation Camps are held every year.

The school has a house system with the aim of developing a competitive spirit in students.  The students are divided into four houses:
 Gandhi House
 Nehru House
 Raman House
 Bose House

The school has different uniforms for summer and winter. 
DAV Sasaram has now adopted Digital classroom i.e. Smart class.

Sport and extracurricular activities
 Sport: The school has acres of playing fields with facilities for football, cricket, badminton, Kho-Kho, Kabaddi, volleyball and athletics. Physical training programmes impart physical fitness, team-spirit and sportsmanship.
 Cultural classes: options include:
 Dance: classical/non-classical
 Music: vocal and instrumental
 Elocution
 Art and painting
 Dramatics
 Educational tours to historical places, museums, research institutions.
 Exhibitions: artistic and science exhibitions are organised.
 Charitable activities: DAV Sasaram makes contributions to victims of disasters.

Admission
Admission is determined on the basis of merit. 5% of places are reserved for talented ST/SC students of the weaker section of the society.

See also
 Dayanand Anglo-Vedic College Trust and Management Society

References

External links
 DAV Education Board

Schools in Bihar
Educational institutions established in 1997
Schools affiliated with the Arya Samaj
1997 establishments in Bihar